Myanmar–Turkey relations are the foreign relations between Myanmar and Turkey. Turkey has an embassy in Naypyidaw and Myanmar's ambassador in Cairo, Egypt is also accredited to Turkey.

Diplomatic relations 
Relations were tense between Myanmar and Turkey because of Turkey's support for the Kuomintang in Taiwan. Burma had hostile relations with Taiwan and intercepted a cargo plane from Taiwan bringing Turkish and American supplies to the Kuomintang. This caused a new diplomatic crisis between Turkey and Burma. Relations improved afterward and were amicable.

Relations became very tense in 1988 after Tatmadaw’s very violent crackdown on peaceful civilian demonstrators. Aung San Suu Kyi gained admiration and sympathy in Turkey during as a result of Tatmadaw’s actions. Turkey subsequently suspended its aid programs except for humanitarian aid. Turkey was very critical of Aung San Suu Kyi's house arrest and collaborated with United States Secretary of State Madeleine Albright, who took a personal interest in her wellbeing.

Economic relations 
 Trade volume between the two countries was 38.7 million USD in 2018 (Turkish exports/imports: 30.7/8 million USD).

See also 

 Foreign relations of Myanmar
 Foreign relations of Turkey

References

Further reading 
 “Minorities in Burmese History.” In Ethnic Conflict in Buddhist Societies. Edited by K. M. de Silva et al. London: Pinter Publishers, 1988. 
 “Myanmar in 1989: Tatmadaw V.” Asian Survey 30, no. 2 (February 1990): pp. 187–95. 
 “Myanmar in 1990: The Unconsummated Election.” Asian Survey 31, no. 2 (February 1991): pp. 205–11.
 Cady, John F. The United States and Burma. The American Foreign Policy Library. Cambridge, Mass.: Harvard University Press, 1976. 
 Gravers, Mikael. Nationalism as Political Paranoia in Burma. An Essay on the Historical Practice of Power. 2nd rev. ed. London: NIAS-Curzon, 1998. 
 Guyot, James. “Burma.” In Rethinking Political Development in Southeast Asia. Edited by Norma Mahmood. Kuala Lumpur, Malaysia: University of Malaya Press, 1994.
 Hall, D. G. E. Burma. London: Hutchinson University Library, 1960. Renard, Ronald D. “For the Fair Name of Myanmar: They Are Being Blotted out of Burma's History.” In Burma: Myanmar in the Twenty-First Century— Dynamics of Continuity and Change. Edited by John J. Brandon. Bangkok: Thai Studies Section, Chulalongkorn University, 1997. 
 Seekins, Donald M. The Disorder in Order: The Army-State in Burma Since 1962. Bangkok: White Lotus, 2002. 
 Taylor, Robert H. The State in Burma. Honolulu: University of Hawaii Press, 1987. 
 Tinker, Hugh. The Union of Burma. London: Oxford University Press, 1959. 
 Trager, Frank N. Burma: From Kingdom to Republic. New York: Frederick A. Praeger, 1966.

Turkey
Bilateral relations of Turkey